A History (1982–1985) is a compilation album by The Golden Palominos, released on July 21, 1992, by Mau Mau Records. It contains the band's first two albums with the exception of "Clean Plate" from The Golden Palominos.

Track listing

References

External links 
 

1992 compilation albums
The Golden Palominos albums
Albums produced by Anton Fier